Allison Miller (born 1974 or 1975) is an American, New York City-based drummer, composer, and teacher.

Early life
Miller is descended from a long line of musicians on the maternal side of her family. Her grandmother was a professional organist in Oklahoma, whose sister was a professional singer. Her mother is a classical pianist and choral director. Miller has a cousin who she described as "a very famous opera singer".

Miller was raised in the Washington, D.C. area, and began playing drums at the age of 10. She attended West Virginia University.

Career

Within two months after graduation, she moved to New York City to study with Michael Carvin and Lenny White, and began her career as a freelance drummer. She has also worked as a producer, composer, and teacher.

She has recorded six albums as a leader: 5 AM Stroll, Boom Tic Boom, No Morphine-No Lilies, Live at Willisau, Otis Was a Polar Bear, and Glitter Wolf as well as working as a session musician. Her work with bands has included forming the band Honey Ear Trio with Rene Hart and Erik Lawrence, Holler and Bam with Toshi Reagon, and her own band, Allison Miller's Boom Tic Boom.

Miller has performed with songwriting vocalists Ani DiFranco, Natalie Merchant, and Erin McKeown, and toured with avant-garde saxophonist Marty Ehrlich, organist Doctor Lonnie Smith and folk-rock singer Brandi Carlile.

Personal life
Miller identifies as a lesbian. In 2013, she contributed an essay to The Huffington Post describing her coming out process and her experiences as a female, lesbian, and feminist in the male-dominated jazz world.

Discography
 5am Stroll (Foxhaven Records) (2005)
 At The End of The Day, Agrazing Maze (Foxhaven Records) 2006
 Boom Tic Boom (Foxhaven Records) (2010)
 Boom Tic Boom: Live at Wilisau (Foxhaven Records) (2012)
 No Morphine No Lilies featuring Boom Tic Boom (The Royal Potato Family) (2013)
 Otis Was a Polar Bear featuring Boom Tic Boom (The Royal Potato Family) (2016)
 Science Fair with Carmen Staaf (Sunnyside Records) (2018)
 Glitter Wolf featuring Boom Tic Boom (The Royal Potato Family) (2019)

Other projects
 Steampunk Serenade - Honey Ear Trio (Miller, Rene Hart, Erik Lawrence) (2011)
 Swivel - Honey Ear Trio (2016)
 Lean - Lean (Miller, Jerome Sabbagh, Simon Jermyn) (2016)
 Parlour Game - Parlour Game (Jenny Scheinman, Miller, Carmen Staaf, Tony Scherr) (Royal Potato Family, 2019)
 ARTEMIS - ARTEMIS (an all-female jazz supergroup) (2020, Blue Note)
 Tues Days (Duet with Jane Ira Bloom) (2021)

As side musician
Miller's work as a session musician includes:

 Betty 3 - Betty (1999)
 No Walls - Virginia Mayhew (2000)
 Phantoms - Virginia Mayhew (2003)
 At The End of The Day - Agrazing Maze (2005) 
 Fingerprint - Eric Deutsch (2007)
 Heart and Soul Live in San Francisco - Kitty Margolis (2005)
 Tiny Resistors - Todd Sickafoose (2008)
 Jungle Soul - Dr. Lonnie Smith (2008)
 Red Letter Year - Ani Difranco (2008)
 Bear Creek - Brandi Carlile (2012)
 ¿Which Side Are You On? - Ani Difranco (2012)
 The Stars Look Very Different Tonight - Ben Allison (2013)
 Out and About - Will Bernard (2016)
 Last Things Last - Greg Cordez (2017)
 An Eight Out of Nine - SLUGish Ensemble, Steven Lugerner (2018)
 Lioness - Lioness (all woman group) (2019)
 Redshift – Josh Deutsch (2020)
 Occasionally – Pat Donaher (2021)

References

External links
 
 
 All About Jazz: Meet drummer Allison Miller
 2012 Audio Interview with Allison Miller from Podcast "I'd Hit That"

1970s births
Living people
American women singer-songwriters
American rock songwriters
American rock singers
West Virginia University alumni
American folk musicians
American lesbian musicians
American LGBT singers
American LGBT songwriters
American women drummers
American rock drummers
Year of birth missing (living people)
Musicians from New York City
Lesbian singers
Lesbian songwriters
20th-century American drummers
21st-century American drummers
American jazz drummers
20th-century American women musicians
21st-century American women musicians
20th-century American LGBT people
21st-century American LGBT people
Jazz musicians from New York (state)
Singer-songwriters from New York (state)
Singer-songwriters from Washington, D.C.